is a bus company in Japan.

Office

Bus garage 
 Hirosaki Bus office (Hirosaki)
 Wattoku Branch office (Hirosaki)
 Fujishiro Branch office (Hirosaki)
 Kuroishi Bus office (Kuroishi)
 Goshogawara Bus office (Goshogawara)
 Kodomari Branch office (Nakadomari)
 Ajigasawa Bus office (Ajigasawa)
 Aomori Bus office (Aomori)

Bus information desk 
The bus information desk sell a commuter pass and a coupon.
 Hirosaki Bus terminal
 Hirosaki Station Information desk
 Ōwani Branch office Information desk
 Kuroishi Station Information desk
 Goshogawara Station Information desk (Goshogawara Bus terminal)
 Goshogawara Bus office Information desk
 Kodomari Branch office Information desk
 Ajigasawa Station Information desk
 Aomori Information center
 Aomori Bus office Information desk

Lines

Highway bus 
Nocturne (ノクターン) (Goshogawara / Hirosaki - Hamamatsucho / Shinagawa / Yokohama)
Tsugaru (津輕号) (Aomori - Tokyo)
Panda (パンダ) (Aomori / Hirosaki - Ueno)
Sky (スカイ号) (Aomori / Hirosaki - Ueno)
Castle (キャッスル) (Hirosaki - Sendai)
Blue City (ブルーシティ) (Sendai - Aomori)
Yodel (ヨーデル) (Hirosaki - Morioka)
Asunaro (あすなろ) (Aomori - Morioka)

Route bus 
Hirosaki - Fujisaki - Itayanagi - Turuta - Goshogawara
Hirosaki - Fujisaki - Namioka
Hirosaki - Inakadate - Kuroishi
Hirosaki - Onoe
Hirosaki - Senseji - Itayanagi - Tokoshinai
Hirosaki - Hamanomachi - Tokoshinai - Ajigasawa
Hirosaki - Ōwani - Ikarigaseki
Kuroishi - Namioka - Aomori
Kuroishi - Nijinoko - Nuruyu
Goshogawara - Aomori
Goshogawara - Kizukuri - Morita - Ajigasawa
Goshogawara - Kanagi - Nakatato - Aiuchi - Kodomari
Goshogawara - Kizukuri - Shariki - Jyūsan - Kodomari
Ajigasawa - Fukaura

Bus companies of Japan
Companies based in Aomori Prefecture